Kim Hye-jin (born February 28, 1975) is a South Korean actress. She is best known for her role in the 2009 television series Iris. She has appeared in Sweet 18 (2004), My Rosy Life (2005), The Secret of Birth (2013) and many more TV series. In 2020, she has confirmed her appearance in  JTBC's drama Undercover, a remake of 2016 BBC miniseries of the same name. Kim Hye-jin is 1.7 m tall and is now ( in 2022 ) 47 years old.

Filmography

Films

Television series

References

External links

South Korean actresses
1975 births
Living people
South Korean television actresses